Nicholas William Sachvie (born December 22, 1991) is a Canadian professional squash player. As of March 2018, he was ranked number 83 in the world.

Sachvie attended Cornell University and majored in Communications while playing for the men's squash team from 2010 to 2014.

He is the 2017 and 2019 Canadian National Champion and he played for Canada in the 2015 and 2017 WSF World Team Squash Championships.

References

1991 births
Living people
Canadian male squash players
Cornell Big Red men's squash players
Sportspeople from St. Catharines
Sportspeople from Toronto
Pan American Games medalists in squash
Pan American Games silver medalists for Canada
Pan American Games bronze medalists for Canada
Squash players at the 2019 Pan American Games
Medalists at the 2019 Pan American Games
21st-century Canadian people